Florent Balmont (born 2 February 1980) is a French former professional footballer who played as a midfielder.

Career
Balmont began his career at Olympique Lyonnais in the 2002–03 Ligue 1 season after coming through the junior ranks.  In the 2003–04 season, Balmont was sent out on loan to Toulouse FC making a total of 35 appearances.  After returning from loan, Balmont signed with OGC Nice.  In his time with Lyon, Balmont won the 2002–03 championship and the 2004 Trophée des Champions, converting his penalty in the latter after the match went to a shoot-out.

Balmont spent four seasons at Nice making 139 appearances before signing with Lille OSC. Balmont won an historic double with the club during the 2010–11 season, making 39 appearances across all competitions as Lille won the Ligue 1 title and the Coupe de France trophy.

In July 2017, Balmont announced he had left Lille to join Dijon FCO, newly promoted to Ligue 1, on a two-year contract.

On 11 May 2019, Balmont made his 500th Ligue 1 appearance in a 2–1 victory over Strasbourg. With the appearance, he moved up to 21st in the all-time Ligue 1 appearances and leads all active players in that category.

Balmont announced his retirement from playing in May 2020 and stated his intention to go into coaching. In July 2020, after his retirement, Balmont began his training as a coach, as he was hired as a U-20 coach and member of the first team staff at Championnat National 3 club FC Limonest Dardilly Saint-Didier. He left the club at the end of the season.

Career statistics

Honours
Lyon
 Ligue 1: 2002–03
 Trophée des Champions: 2004

Lille
 Ligue 1: 2010–11
 Coupe de France: 2010–11

References

External links
 
 
 

1980 births
Living people
People from Sainte-Foy-lès-Lyon
Sportspeople from Lyon Metropolis
Association football midfielders
French footballers
Olympique Lyonnais players
Toulouse FC players
OGC Nice players
Lille OSC players
Dijon FCO players
Ligue 1 players
Championnat National 3 players
Mediterranean Games bronze medalists for France
Mediterranean Games medalists in football
Competitors at the 2001 Mediterranean Games
Footballers from Auvergne-Rhône-Alpes